Jeremy Giordano Aguirre Miñán (born 2 February 1999) is a Peruvian footballer who plays as a goalkeeper for Deportivo Binacional.

Career

Club career
As a youth player, Aguirre represented Cantolao and Esther Grande and joined Sport Boys in 2018. He started on the club's reserve team, where he quickly became the captain, but was also on the bench for two Peruvian Primera División games in his first season.

In the 2019 season, he was still playing for the reserve team. The club decided to let him go out on loan to Peruvian Segunda División club Sport Loreto in the summer 2019 for the rest of the season. He made 8 appearances for the team before returning to Sport Boys for the 2020 season. He left the club at the end of the year.

On 1 February 2021, Aguirre joined Segunda División club Deportivo Coopsol. After a year at Coopsol, Aguirre joined Deportivo Binacional in February 2022.

International career
In April 2017, Aguirre was called up for the Peru U18 squad for the first time. He later also got his debut for Peru U20 on 14 November 2018 in a friendly game against Ecuador U20. Aguirre was also a part of the squad to play the 2019 South American U-20 Championship in January 2020, however, as an unused substitute.

References

External links
 
 

Living people
1999 births
Association football goalkeepers
Peruvian footballers
Peruvian Segunda División players
Academia Deportiva Cantolao players
Esther Grande footballers
Sport Boys footballers
Sport Loreto players
Deportivo Coopsol players